Sir Robert Chambre Hill CB (25March 17785March 1860) was a British Army cavalry officer who fought in the Peninsular War and was wounded while in command of the Royal Horse Guards at the Battle of Waterloo on 18June 1815.

Background
He was born on 25March 1778 at Hawkstone Hall near Prees, Shropshire, the fourth son of Sir John Hill, 3rd Baronet, a Shropshire farmer and landowner and Mary, daughter and co-heir to John Chambré of Petton, Shropshire. One of his elder brothers was Rowland, later Lord Hill.

Career
Educated at Rugby School from 1788, Hill was appointed a cornet in the 6th Dragoons on 29July 1795. Promotion to lieutenant followed  on 26August 1796 and to captain on 15June 1804. He then transferred as a major to the Royal Horse Guards (Blues) on 15November 1805 and received his brevet promotion to lieutenant-colonel on 1January 1819.

He commanded the Blues during the Peninsular War and led a brigade of cavalry at the 1813 Battle of Vitoria, for which he received the Army Gold Medal. At Waterloo, Hill, while a commander of the Royal Horse Guards, was wounded when a musket ball entered his right shoulder and passed through his arm. Despite the injury, Hill remained on the battlefield until close to the completion of the action.

For his services in the battle he was made a Companion of the Order of the Bath (CB), a Knight of the Russian Order of St. George of the Fourth Class, and a Knight of the Austrian Military Order of Maria Theresa.

He was knighted by the Prince Regent on 29May 1812 as a proxy for his brother, Rowland, who was already a Knight of the Bath.

Hill later became Deputy Lieutenant of Shropshire, a magistrate for the Wem and Whitchurch divisions, and a Commissioner of Income and Property Taxes for the latter.

Family
Hill married Eliza, daughter of Henry Lumley on 5February 1801 and they had the following children:

George-Stavely, born 1801, married Jane daughter of Thomas Borough in 1832.
Alfred-Edward, born 19March 1810 who became a captain in the British Army and married the daughter of the Earl of Kilmorey on 9April 1839. 
Percy, born 24December 1817 who became a Lieutenant-Colonel in the 95th Regiment of Foot (Rifles) and married Harriet-Cecilia, daughter of Captain John Steuart.  
Mary-Julia

His brothers Rowland, Thomas and Clement also followed military careers and were all present at the Battle of Waterloo.

References

Bibliography

1778 births
1860 deaths
British Army personnel of the Napoleonic Wars
Royal Horse Guards officers
Companions of the Order of the Bath
Knights Cross of the Military Order of Maria Theresa
Recipients of the Order of St. George of the Fourth Degree
Military personnel from Shropshire
Deputy Lieutenants of Shropshire
Younger sons of baronets